The 2009 NHRA Full Throttle Drag Racing Season consisted of 24 national events held at tracks across the U.S.  The first 18 events made up the regular season, with the final events making up the "Countdown to 1".

Schedule

Points standings

Drivers in bold have clinched the championship

Mike Edwards last won a title in 1981 (Modified Class), the longest gap in NHRA history.

The teams running a Dodge Stratus have been notified by the NHRA that body style, because of it is out of production for the past five years, will be illegal in 2010.  Dodge teams must run the Avenger in 2010.  Pro Stock Cars may be any approved car (Mustang, Cobalt, Avenger, GXP, GTO) from the past five years.

References

External links
 Official website
 Official NHRA Drag Racing Podcasts
 Drag Race Central The Latest NHRA News and Analysis

NHRA Camping World Drag Racing Series
NHRA Full Throttle